"It Had to Be You" is a popular song composed by Isham Jones, with lyrics by Gus Kahn. By early August, it was the number 1 record in the United States, where it remained for five weeks, finishing as the Number 4 single of the year 1924.
It is now in the public domain.

A version with lyrics by Gus Kahn, vocal by Marion Harris (she'd signed with Brunswick in 1922) and Phil Ohman, piano was recorded at Brunswick in March 1924.

Appearances in film and television
By Ruth Etting in the 1936 short film Melody in May
By Edward G. Robinson and Harry Seymour with Seymour on piano in the 1938 film A Slight Case of Murder 
By Priscilla Lane in the 1939 film The Roaring Twenties 
By Dooley Wilson in the 1942 film Casablanca
In the 1944 film Mr. Skeffington, by Danny Thomas 
By George Murphy in Show Business (1944)
Betty Hutton in the 1945 film Incendiary Blonde
By Ginger Rogers and Cornel Wilde in the 1947 film It Had to Be You
Gene Kelly and Marie McDonald danced to it in the 1947 film  Living in a Big Way (while it was being sung by a mixed group)
In the 1951 film I'll See You in My Dreams (based loosely upon the lives of Gus Kahn and his wife Grace LeBoy Kahn)
Joanne Dru sang a portion of it in 1955's Hell on Frisco Bay. 
Ray Charles on The Genius of Ray Charles (1959).
Tina Louise, as Ginger Grant, sang it to Gilligan in the second season Gilligan's Island episode, "Forward March" (1966).
Diane Keaton in the 1977 film Annie Hall
Sung by Andrea Marcovicci (and Danny Devito) in the 1982 episode of the TV series Taxi, "Louie's Revenge"
Peter Riegert and Amy Irving dance to the song in Crossing Delancey (1988). 
 Featured in season 4 episode 7 of The Golden Girls, "Sophia's Wedding (Part 2) (1988) 
As the "theme" of When Harry Met Sally (1989), it finished as #60 in AFI's 100 Years...100 Songs survey of top tunes in American cinema.
In the 1992 film A League of Their Own by Megan Cavanagh 
In the Doctor Who episode "The Empty Child", aired 2005

References

Bibliography 
 Who Wrote that Song? Dick Jacobs and Harriet Jacobs, published by Writer's Digest Books, 1993

1924 songs
1924 singles
Pop standards
Songs with music by Isham Jones
Songs with lyrics by Gus Kahn